Piceatannol is the organic compound with the formula . Classified as a stilbenoid and a phenol, it is a white solid, although samples often are yellow owing to impurities.

Natural occurrences 
Piceatannol and its glucoside, astringin, are found in mycorrhizal and non-mycorrhizal roots of Norway spruces (Picea abies). It can also be found in the seeds of the palm Aiphanes horrida and in Gnetum cleistostachyum. The chemical structure of piceatannol was established by Cunningham et al. as being an analog of resveratrol.

In food 
Piceatannol is a metabolite of resveratrol found in red wine, grapes, passion fruit, white tea, and Japanese knotweed. Astringin, a piceatannol glucoside, is also found in red wine.  The formation of piceatannol from resveratrol is catalyzed by cytochrome P450.

Biochemical study 
A 1989 in vitro study found that piceatannol blocked LMP2A, a viral protein-tyrosine kinase implicated in leukemia, non-Hodgkin's lymphoma and other diseases associated with Epstein–Barr virus.  In 2003, this prompted research interest in piceatannol and its effect on these diseases.

Injected in rats, piceatannol shows a rapid glucuronidation and a poor bioavailability, according to a 2006 study.

Piceatannol affect gene expressions, gene functions and insulin action, resulting in the delay or complete inhibition of adipogenesis.

See also 
 Pterostilbene
 List of phytochemicals in food

References

Further reading 
 

Stilbenoids
Protein kinase inhibitors